Polluting Paradise (also known as Garbage in the Garden of Eden) is a 2012 German documentary film directed by Fatih Akın. The film was screened in the Special Screenings section at the 2012 Cannes Film Festival. It focuses on the Turkish village of Çamburnu in Sürmene, which has been turned into a rubbish dump by the government.

References

External links
 

2012 films
2012 in the environment
2012 documentary films
Documentary films about environmental issues
Pollution in Turkey
German documentary films
2010s German-language films
Films directed by Fatih Akin
Films set in Turkey
Landfills
2010s German films